Gonna Make U Jump is a compilation album by hip hop duo Kris Kross, first released April 28, 1998. It was the group's last album.  Although it is a compilation, the album only contains four out of the ten singles released by the group.  Due to this fact, it was not well received.

Track listing
"It's a Group Thang" – 0:53 
"Lil' Boys in da Hood" – 3:05 
"Jump" – 3:17 
"2 da Beat Ch'yall" – 3:43 
"Da Bomb" feat. Da Brat – 4:12 
"Live and Die for Hip Hop" feat. Da Brat, Aaliyah, Jermaine Dupri & Mr. Black – 3:46 
"Party" – 4:03 
"Tonite's tha Night" – 3:19 
"We're in da House" – 0:39 
"A Lot 2 Live 4" – 2:15

References

Kris Kross albums
1998 compilation albums